Magadeline Lesolobe (born 1983), best known by her stage name Charma Gal, is a Botswana singer-songwriter.

Early life 
Charma Gal was born in Botswana in a small village called Lerala. She was married to Kabelo Mogwe, but the two later divorced in 2016.  Charma Gal is a mother of two. Charma Gal is one of the founding members of the group Culture Spears, which was founded in 2005. She left the group to form her own group, called Eke Ntolo, which has released seven albums.

Music career
Charma Gal released a new album in April 2017:Mmokolodi]], (transl. I am going to Mmokolodi.) She has collaborated with various artists including Jah Prayzah on the song "Dali Wangu" Charma Gal was also featured by Master KG on single "Nsalele le ngwana" in 2018. Charma Gal released her seventh studio album "Lekgamu La Bananyana" in November 2018. The album was released through Charma Gal Productions. "Lekgamu La Bananyana",the title track of the album , which made it to the Yarona Fm Top 20 Count Down and peaked at position 10.

See also 
 Vee Mampeezy
 Sasa Klaas
 Ross Branch

References

1983 births
Living people
Tswana people
Botswana songwriters
Botswana women singers
People from Central District (Botswana)